Əhmədabad (also, Akhmedabad) is a village and municipality in the Sabirabad Rayon of Azerbaijan.  It has a population of 2,460.

References 

Populated places in Sabirabad District